Kracker is a surname. It stems from German (nick)names Kräger or Kräcker, and may originate from kraken (to whine, to complain). The surname may refer to
Johann Lucas Kracker (1717–1779), Austrian-Czech painter
Tobias Kracker (1655–1736), Austrian sculptor and painter
Uncle Kracker (born 1974), American singer-songwriter and musician

References

German-language surnames